Nebria angustata angustata is a subspecies of beetle in the family Carabidae found in Italy and Switzerland.

References

angustata angustata
Beetles described in 1831
Beetles of Europe